The year 1519 in science and technology included many events, some of which are listed here.

Exploration
 September 20 – Ferdinand Magellan's fleet sets sail from Sanlúcar de Barrameda to find a westabout route to Asia.
 "Miller Atlas" produced in Portugal.

Medicine
 A pandemic spreads from the Greater Antilles into Central America, and perhaps as far as Peru, killing much of the indigenous populations in these areas.
 Publication in Paris of Thomas Linacre's translation into Latin of Galen's Methodus medendi.

Births
 June 6 – Andrea Cesalpino, Italian philosopher, physician, and botanist (died 1603)

Deaths
 May 2 – Leonardo da Vinci, Italian polymath (born 1452)

References

 
16th century in science
1510s in science